The Jeonju Hyanggyo is a hyanggyo (school) originally established at the Gyeonggijeon Shrine site in Jeonju, Korea, sometime early in the 15th century, during the Joseon Dynasty (1392-1910). Gyeonggijeon Shrine was erected in  1410, so construction of the Jeonju Hyanggyo had to follow sometime later.

At the time of the Second Japanese Invasion in 1592 the Gyeonggijeon Shrine and the Jeonju Hyanggyo were completely destroyed. In 1603 the hyanggyo was moved to and rebuilt at its present Jeonju location.

Unlike the more typical hyanggyo Jeonhakhumyo style described above at the Goheung Hyanggyo, the Jeonju Hyanggyo employees the less conventional style of being placed on level ground.  The memorial enshrinement area centers on the Daeseongjeon (Confucian shrine hall) in the front, while the educational area centers on the Myeongyundang (lecture hall) that is located the rear.  This is an unusual configuration for a hyanggyo.  In all, there are a total of 99 rooms at the Jeonju Hyanggyo.

The Jeonju Hyanggyo is designated historical treasure #379.

Gallery

References

Hyanggyo
Jeonju
Buildings and structures in North Jeolla Province
Tourist attractions in North Jeolla Province